is a rechargeable contactless smart card ticketing system for public transport in Oita Prefecture, Japan. Oita Bus, Oita Kōtsū, and Kamenoi Bus introduced the system on December 26, 2010. Like other electronic fare collection systems in Japan, the card uses FeliCa, RFID technology developed by Sony. The design of the card combines Nimoca mascot Ferret with Mejiron (めじろん?), the mascot character widely loved as Oita Prefecture's cheering squad.

As of December 2010, the card is usable for some local bus lines by Oita Bus and Oita Kōtsū for Oita. On March 20, 2011, the card is also usable for all the bus lines by the operators. 

At the same time Mejiron Nimoca was introduced, the three operators also introduced Nimoca, meaning the latter card is also usable in those lines. As Mejiron Nimoca and Nimoca have integrated services, SUGOCA, Hayakaken and Suica are also usable in the Mejiron Nimoca-accepting area.

Usable area
As of March 2011
Buses 
Oita Bus: All local bus lines, and some express bus lines.
Oita Kōtsū: All local bus lines and Airliner airport report bus lines.
Kamenoi Bus: All local bus lines.
Others (as electronic money): 
 All Lawson stores in Oita Prefecture.

Types of cards
Nimoca: Does not require registration.
Star Nimoca: Requires registration. It can be reissued when a user lost it.
Credit Nimoca: A credit card with the above functions.
These three cards can be issued either as prepaid cards or commuters passes.

References

External links 
 Official website

Fare collection systems in Japan
Contactless smart cards